Pratima is a 1945 Indian Hindustani-language movie directed by Paidi Jairaj. The film was produced by Bombay Talkies and was the directorial debut of P. Jairaj. The film stars Dilip Kumar, Swaran Lata, Mumtaz Ali, Shah Nawaz and Mukri. Swarn Lata was cast following her big success the preceding year, Rattan (1944). Mukri was cast in his debut role by Devika Rani, who is stated to have "liked his smile and off-screen enthusiasm". The music direction was by Arun Kumar Mukherjee and the lyricist was Narendra Sharma.

References

External links 
 

1945 films
1940s Hindi-language films
Indian drama films
1945 drama films
Indian black-and-white films
1945 directorial debut films
Hindi-language drama films